Microphysogobio elongatus is a species of cyprinid fish endemic to China.

References

Microphysogobio
Fish described in 1977